The 1998 U.S. Open Cup Final was the 85th final of the Lamar Hunt U.S. Open Cup, the United States's oldest soccer cup competition. The match, contested by the Chicago Fire and Columbus Crew, took place on October 30, 1998 at Soldier Field in Chicago, Illinois. It was Chicago's and the Crew's first U.S Open Cup campaign and their first final in the U.S. Open Cup. The Chicago Fire won the game 2–1 in overtime thanks to goals from Jerzy Podbrożny and Frank Klopas while the Crew goal came from Stern John.

Fire defender, C. J. Brown, was named the Man of the Match after the game. 

The final was originally scheduled to take place on August 26, 1998, in Virginia Beach, Virginia, but was postponed by a day after the arrival of Hurricane Bonnie. After a second postponement, the match was moved to Chicago despite objections from the Columbus Crew front office.

Match

Details

References

Open Cup Final
U.S. Open Cup Final
1998
U.S. Open Cup Final 1998
U.S. Open Cup Final 1998